The Talna is a left tributary of the river Tur in Romania. It discharges into the Tur in Gherța Mică. The upper reach of the river, upstream of the junction with the Talna Mică, is sometimes considered to be a headwater of the river and is referred to as Talna Mare.

Tributaries

The following rivers are tributaries to the river Talna:

Left: Brada, Talna Mică, Racșa, Pleșca, Valea Muntelui

References 

Rivers of Romania
Rivers of Satu Mare County